Oscar Martin "Slim" Harrell (1890–1971) was an American Major League Baseball pitcher. He played for the Philadelphia Athletics during the  season. He attended Baylor University.

His Baylor yearbook lauded him as one of the premier college pitchers in the State.  Despite this, he only appeared in one Major League game.

References

1890 births
1971 deaths
Major League Baseball pitchers
Philadelphia Athletics players
Holyoke Papermakers players
Memphis Chickasaws players
Baseball players from Texas
Baylor University alumni
People from Johnson County, Texas